Donegal Creek is a  tributary of Chiques Creek in Lancaster County, Pennsylvania in the United States.

The stream rises from Donegal Springs in East Donegal Township.

See also
List of rivers of Pennsylvania

References

Rivers of Pennsylvania
Tributaries of the Susquehanna River
Rivers of Lancaster County, Pennsylvania